A grand duchy is a country or territory whose official head of state or ruler is a monarch bearing the title of grand duke or grand duchess.

Relatively rare until the abolition of the Holy Roman Empire in 1806, the term was often used in the official name of countries smaller than most continental kingdoms of modern Europe (e.g., Hungary, Castile, England) yet larger than most of the sovereign duchies in the Holy Roman Empire (e.g. Anhalt, Lorraine, Modena, Schleswig-Holstein). Only two grand duchies existed during the Holy Roman Empire's tenure, both located in Imperial Italy: Tuscany (declared as such in 1569) and Savoy (in 1696). During the 19th century there were as many as 14 grand duchies in Europe at once (a few of which were first created as exclaves of the Napoleonic empire but later re-created, usually with different borders, under another dynasty). Some of these were sovereign and nominally independent (Baden, Hesse and by Rhine, Mecklenburg-Schwerin, Mecklenburg-Strelitz, Oldenburg, Saxe-Weimar and Tuscany), some sovereign but held in personal union with larger realms by a monarch whose grand-dukedom was borne as a subsidiary title (Finland, Luxembourg, Transylvania), some of which were client states of a more powerful realm (Cleves and Berg), and some whose territorial boundaries were nominal and the position purely titular (Frankfurt).

In the 21st century, only Luxembourg remains a grand duchy.

Luxembourg
The only grand duchy still extant is Luxembourg. It regained its independence from Napoleonic France and became a sovereign grand duchy in 1815 by decision of the Congress of Vienna which dealt with the political aftermath of the Napoleonic Wars.

In order to act as a sufficient counterbalance to France, the Congress decided to grant the dignity of grand duke of Luxembourg to the monarch of the newly created United Kingdom of the Netherlands which comprised present-day Netherlands and Belgium. Luxembourg remained in personal union with the crown of the Netherlands until 1890 when William III, King of the Netherlands and Grand Duke of Luxembourg, died without leaving a male heir. He was succeeded on the Dutch throne by his daughter Wilhelmina, but she could not become Grand Duchess of Luxembourg under the semi-Salic law established by the Congress of Vienna. In terms of the law, the grand ducal throne had to be passed to a male dynast. If there were no male heirs in a specific branch of the House of Nassau, the throne would go to the next in line from any of the other branches. This resulted in the title of grand duke being bestowed on a distant male cousin of William III, Adolphe, from the elder branch of Nassau-Weilburg (at present Luxembourg-Nassau). The current monarch is  Henri, Grand Duke of Luxembourg since 2000.

Grand duchies of the past
The contemporary independent republics of Finland and Lithuania have been grand duchies during certain eras of their history.

The same is true for the core state of what would ultimately become the Russian Empire: the Grand Duchy of Muscovy.

History
The term "grand duchy" is of relatively late invention, used at first in Western Europe in 1569 in the case of Tuscany, to denote either territories of a particularly mighty duke or territories of significant importance in political, economical or military matters without being of sufficient size or importance to be recognized internationally as a kingdom.

The number of duchies had inflated towards the end of the Middle Ages to an extent that included middle-sized towns or relatively small fiefs, as compared to the national, pre-medieval tribal provinces. As a consequence, a new title was needed to make the difference between important and unimportant regional powers: the title grand duke was born.

One of the first examples was the unofficial use of the title for the dukes of Burgundy, who almost succeeded in forming a new kingdom in the historical region of Lotharingia. Collectively known as the Burgundian State in modern historiography, they held lands in modern-day eastern France (Burgundy, Franche-Comté, Alsatia, Lorraine, Champagne, Picardy and Nord-Pas-de-Calais) as well as most of modern Belgium, the Netherlands and Luxembourg and small parts of western Germany (Burgundian Netherlands). The first monarchy ever officially titled a "grand duchy" was the Medici sovereignty over Tuscany under suzerainty of the Holy Roman Emperors, the first rulers receiving the title in 1569. Tuscany remained a grand duchy until 1860, when it was annexed by the Kingdom of Sardinia which succeeded in establishing a united Kingdom of Italy. 

In 1696, the Duchy of Savoy became the Grand Duchy of Savoy when its duke was promoted to grand duke by writ of the emperor. The title was considered a necessary bribe to keep Savoy aligned with the rest of the imperial states during the Nine Years War against France. From 1713, the primary title of the ruler of the Savoyard state became "king" instead (briefly of Sicily, then of Sardinia from 1720 onward).Peter Wilson. "Heart of Europe: A History of the Holy Roman Empire." Cambridge: 2016. Pages 227 and 445.

In the early nineteenth century, Napoléon I occasionally used the title "grand duchy" for several French satellite states given to his relatives or generals. Other allies abandoned the orbit of the Holy Roman Empire to join Napoleon's nominally independent Confederation of the Rhine. The elevation of these vassals to the title of grand duke was usually accompanied by an expansion of their realms with additional territory gathered at the expense of  subdued powers such as Prussia. Though Napoleon was defeated at the Battle of Waterloo and most of his newly created satellite states abolished, the Congress of Vienna restored some of the previous sovereign duchies and principalities, while recognizing others as grand duchies. As a result, the 19th century saw the creation of a new group of grand duchies in central Europe, such as the grand duchies of Hesse, Baden and Oldenburg.

Historically, in Europe a sovereign grand duke was one of the highest ranks among hereditary rulers after emperor and king, and was equal to that of prince-elector; ranking as royalty, i.e., European rulers and, in Germany, the reigning nobility. The correct form of address (also for the heir apparent and his wife) is Royal Highness (HRH).

The title of grand duke borne under the Russian Empire by children and grandchildren of its rulers was a non-sovereign honorific, unrelated to any grand duchy, to which was attached the style of Imperial Highness (HIH). Ranking, internationally, no higher than the members of other reigning dynasties whose head held the title of emperor, the usage was an historical anomaly, persisting from the elevation of the Grand Duchy of Muscovy to the tsardom and, later, empire of All Russia, until its collapse in 1917.

Associated titles
In several Balto-Slavic languages (such as Russian and Lithuanian), the term often translated into English as "grand duke" is literally grand prince. In some western European languages (English, French, Spanish, Italian, Portuguese, etc.), the term "grand prince" was rare or non-existent, used to refer to some rulers of Russia, Transylvania or Tuscany prior to the 19th century.

Emerging from the Middle Ages, the rulers of Lithuania and of historic Russian states, as well as other Eastern European princes and later Russian dynasts, were referred to by the title , whose literal English translation is "grand prince" rather than "grand duke". Although grand prince is found in historical references, since the reign of Catherine the Great, the Russian  has usually been translated into English as "grand duke". Since the 18th century it has also been used to refer to cadets of the imperial House of Romanov who were children or patrilineal grandchildren of a Russian emperor. More remote descendants of emperors were titled "prince".

The title  or "grand duke" is said to have been used by the rulers of Lithuania, and after rulers from the Jagiellonian dynasty became Kings of Poland, it was found among the titles used by the rulers of the Polish–Lithuanian Commonwealth. The Polish kings of the Swedish House of Vasa also used this grand-princely title for their non-Polish territories.

 
Junior members of the dynasties of historical grand duchies in Germany sometimes bore the style of Highness, sometimes that of Grand Ducal Highness, and continued to be accorded those styles post-monarchy by courtesy in such reference works as the Almanach de Gotha and Burke's Peerage.

List
Prior to the Napoleonic Wars, only two grand duchies (three if Lithuania is counted, as its title was officially translated as such) were recognized in Europe. Both were in Italy and both were elevated to that status by Holy Roman Emperors who were their nominal suzerains:

 Grand Duchy of Tuscany (1569–1860, absorbed into the Kingdom of Italy afterwards)
 Grand Duchy of Savoy (1696–1847, fused into the greater Kingdom of Sardinia, which was later absorbed into the Kingdom of Italy)

Other states whose names are translated as "grand duchy" in English were, properly, grand principalities:

 Grand Duchy of Lithuania (Lithuanian: Lietuvos Didžioji Kunigaikštystė, Ruthenian: Великое князство Литовське; established c. 1183/1236, in personal union with the Kingdom of Poland in 1386–1401, 1447–1492, and 1501–1795)
 Grand Duchy of Moscow
 Grand Duchy of Kiev (Ruthenian: Вели́ке Кня́зівство Київське)
 Grand Duchy of Ryazan
 Grand Duchy of Rus' (Ruthenian: Велике Князівство Руське)
 Grand Principality of Transylvania (1765–1867) a realm of the Hungarian Crown and after 1804 an Austrian crown land.

The Napoleonic Wars saw several minor ducal titles so elevated, and between then and World War I there were many grand duchies in Europe. Some were created in the Napoleonic era, others were recognized by the Congress of Vienna and were founding members of the German Confederation.

 Grand Duchy of Berg (1806–1813, absorbed into Prussia afterwards)
 Grand Duchy of Würzburg (1806–1814, absorbed into Bavaria afterwards)
 Grand Duchy of Baden (1806–1918, joined the German Empire in 1871)
 Grand Duchy of Hesse (1806–1918, joined the German Empire in 1871)
 Grand Duchy of Fulda (1816–1866) part of the Electorate of Hesse, annexed by Prussia 1866)
 Grand Duchy of Frankfurt (1810–1813, part of several German states afterwards)
 Grand Duchy of the Lower Rhine (1815–1822 as part of Prussia)
 Grand Duchy of Luxembourg (from 1815 in personal union with the Netherlands until 1890. Extant independently)
 Grand Duchy of Mecklenburg-Schwerin (1815–1918, joined the German Empire in 1871)
 Grand Duchy of Mecklenburg-Strelitz (1815–1918, joined the German Empire in 1871)
 Grand Duchy of Posen (1815–1848 as a de facto part of Prussia (nominally ruled in a personal union))
 Grand Duchy of Saxe-Weimar-Eisenach (1815–1918, joined the German Empire in 1871)
 Grand Duchy of Oldenburg (1829–1918, joined the German Empire in 1871)
 Grand Duchy of Cracow (1846–1918 nominally a separate Austrian crown land, administered as part of Galicia and Lodomeria)

The term "grand duchy" is often, but incorrectly, used in reference to Warsaw between 1807 and 1813, which was in fact the Duchy of Warsaw.

Metonymy
In Belgium and to some extent in France, Grand-Duché (French for "grand duchy") is often used as a metonym to refer to the neighbouring country, the Grand Duchy of Luxembourg. This practice helps to avoid confusion with the adjacent Belgian Province of Luxembourg, i.e. the Walloon-speaking part of the portion of Luxembourg which was annexed by Belgium in 1839.

See also
 Archduke
 Duchy
 Grand principality
 Herzog

References

External links 
 

Monarchy
Dukedoms